Birovača is a village in Croatia. It is connected by the D218 highway.

During the Croatian War of Independence, Birovača was in the Republic of Serbian Krajina.

Population

According to the 2011 census, Birovača had 77 inhabitants.

Note: From 1857-1880 data is include in settlement of Dnopolje. Till 1931 it was part of settlement (hamlet).

1991 census 

According to the 1991 census, settlement of Birovača had 247 inhabitants, which were ethnically declared as this:

Austro-Hungarian 1910 census 

According to the 1910 census, settlement of Birovača had 403 inhabitants in 4 hamlets, which were linguistically and religiously declared as this:

Literature 

  Savezni zavod za statistiku i evidenciju FNRJ i SFRJ, popis stanovništva 1948, 1953, 1961, 1971, 1981. i 1991. godine.
 Knjiga: "Narodnosni i vjerski sastav stanovništva Hrvatske, 1880-1991: po naseljima, autor: Jakov Gelo, izdavač: Državni zavod za statistiku Republike Hrvatske, 1998., ;

References 

Populated places in Lika-Senj County